Koduppunna is a small village in kuttanad region of Alappuzha district in Kerala. It lies 2 km away from the Alappuzha- Changanacherry road. It is a part of Edathua Panchayath.

How to reach 

Koduppunna can be easily accessed by road. The nearest towns are Changanacherry and Edathua. The Kerala State Road Transport Corporation (KSRTC) Runs 28 bus services daily through this village. Nearest bus stations are Changanacherry(11 km) and Edathua (7 km). Major nearby towns are Alappuzha (21 km), Kottayam  (31 km) Mavelikkara (27 km) Thiruvalla (23 km) and Harippad (20 km). It is also well connected with waterways. Nearby villages are Puthukkary, oorukkary, Mithrakary, Thayamkary, Ramankary, Champakulam and Edathua.

Place of Worship

Temples
Major Koduppunnakavu Devi Temple, Koduppunna
Palathitta Kalarickal Temple, Koduppunna
Pazhudi padanilam Temple, Koduppunna
Venkida Temple
Paroor Temple

Churches
St Joseph's Church, Koduppunna
St Jude's Shrine, Koduppunna

Education Institutions
Government HSS, Koduppunna
Vijayamatha Public School, Koduppunna

Notable people 
Kodupunna Govinda Ganakan

References

External links
http://www.vijayamatha.com/
http://www.syromalabarchurch.in/parish.php?id=1981

Villages in Alappuzha district